WSFL-FM (106.5 MHz) is a classic rock radio station located in New Bern, North Carolina that broadcasts to the entire eastern region of North Carolina. It has been around for several decades and is considered a fixture in the local community.

History
WSFL was one of the first Top 40 FM stations in North Carolina. During the 1980s the format switched to adult contemporary.

In December 1986, Caravelle Broadcast Group Inc. completed its purchase of WSFL-FM and Kinston radio stations WISP and WQDW.

In March 1989, after Ayatollah Khomeini issued a fatwā against Salman Rushdie for writing The Satanic Verses, WSFL-FM burned all of its Cat Stevens records.

WSFL and several other stations went off the air for a while, but WSFL-FM came back with an album rock format. By 1994, WSFL-FM was airing John Boy and Billy.

In 1995, WSFL (1380 AM) became WCOO after J4 Broadcasting bought the station along with WCKO in Norfolk, Virginia and WCKN in Myrtle Beach, South Carolina. These stations began using the WCIN "Classic Oldies" format of R&B, jazz and blues.

On February 2, 2017, Beasley Media Group announced that it would sell its six stations and four translators in the Greenville-New Bern-Jacksonville, North Carolina market, including WSFL-FM, to Curtis Media Group for $11 million to reduce the company's debt. The sale was completed on May 1, 2017.

References

External links
WSFL's official website

SFL-FM
Classic rock radio stations in the United States
New Bern, North Carolina
Radio stations established in 1968
1968 establishments in North Carolina